The metal–nitride–oxide–semiconductor or metal–nitride–oxide–silicon (MNOS) transistor is a type of MOSFET (metal–oxide–semiconductor field-effect transistor) in which the oxide layer is replaced by a double layer of nitride and oxide. It is an alternative and supplement to the existing standard MOS technology, wherein the insulation employed is a nitride-oxide layer. It is used in  non-volatile computer memory.

History

The original MOSFET (metal–oxide–semiconductor field-effect transistor, or MOS transistor) was invented by Egyptian engineer Mohamed M. Atalla and Korean engineer Dawon Kahng at Bell Labs in 1959, and demonstrated in 1960. Kahng went on to invent the floating-gate MOSFET with Simon Min Sze at Bell Labs, and they proposed its use as a floating-gate (FG) memory cell, in 1967. This was the first form of non-volatile memory based on the injection and storage of charges in a floating-gate MOSFET, which later became the basis for EPROM (erasable PROM), EEPROM (electrically erasable PROM) and flash memory technologies.

In late 1967, a Sperry research team led by H.A. Richard Wegener invented the metal–nitride–oxide–semiconductor (MNOS) transistor, a type of MOSFET in which the oxide layer is replaced by a double layer of nitride and oxide. Nitride was used as a trapping layer instead of a floating gate, but its use was limited as it was considered inferior to a floating gate.

Charge trap (CT) memory was introduced with MNOS devices in the late 1960s. It had a device structure and operating principles similar to floating-gate (FG) memory, but the main difference is that the charges are stored in a conducting material (typically a doped polysilicon layer) in FG memory, whereas CT memory stored charges in localized traps within a dielectric layer (typically made of silicon nitride).

See also
 Field-effect transistor
 MISFET
 MOSFET
 SONOS

References

Transistor types
Field-effect transistors
MOSFETs